Wembley High Technology College (also known as WHTC) is a coeducational secondary school and sixth form with academy status, situated in Brent, a borough situated in Greater London, England.

Formerly called East Lane County Secondary school since 1934, then Wembley High School from 1979, Wembley High Technology College was established in 2003 and is a popular and heavily oversubscribed secondary school. Paul Bhatia is the current headteacher. Wembley High was assessed as 'Outstanding' by Ofsted and has achieved one of the top results in Brent . Its Chair of Governors is Councillor Ruth Moher, and the school's ward is located at Northwick Park.

The college has recently improved facilities, adding a new science block, several astroturf pitches (2008) a new hall (2009), and a sixth form block (2011). The school converted to academy status in August 2012.

References

External links
 Official website of Wembley High Technology College
 Ofsted page
 Ofsted 30 September 2008 Report
 Wembley High College Report 2007
 LA Report, July 2008
 College Prospectus, 2008-09

Educational institutions established in 1979
Secondary schools in the London Borough of Brent
1979 establishments in England
Training schools in England
Academies in the London Borough of Brent
Wembley